The Lover's Inventory is a poetry collection by the Singaporean poet Cyril Wong inventorying objects, places, sensations, and other memorabilia that serve as springboards for memory and philosophical insight; its Confessional verse "confesses without dreary interrogation...in which masks slip on and off in pure, poetic theatre", while the poetry's openness has been transformed into "a defiant act against cultural hypocrisy." The book is "a self-portrait built out of an inventory of intimacies", offering "a critical and tender exploration of how love and sex both help and prevent us from fully understanding ourselves and each other." The book received the Singapore Literature Prize for English poetry in 2016.

See also
 Singapore gay literature
 Cyril Wong

References

LGBT culture in Singapore
Singaporean literature
2015 poetry books
Poetry collections